Cristian Ciobanu (born 3 July 1994) is a Romanian professional footballer who plays as a midfielder for Gloria Buzău.

Honours
Turris Turnu Măgurele
Liga III: 2018–19

References

External links
 
 

1994 births
Living people
People from Curtea de Argeș
Romanian footballers
Association football midfielders
Liga I players
Liga II players
CS Concordia Chiajna players
FC Universitatea Cluj players
ASC Daco-Getica București players
AFC Turris-Oltul Turnu Măgurele players
FC Gloria Buzău players